The 1964 BYU Cougars football team represented Brigham Young University (BYU) as a member of the Western Athletic Conference (WAC) during the 1964 NCAA University Division football season. In their first season under head coach Tommy Hudspeth, the Cougars compiled an overall record of 3–6–1 with a mark of 0–4 against conference opponents, finished last out of six teams in the WAC, and were outscored by a combined total of 210 to 173.

Quarterback Virgil Carter led the team with 1,154 passing yards, 1,542 yards of total offense, and 32 points scored. Other statistical leaders included John Ogden with 770 rushing yards and Bruce Smith with 470 receiving yards.

Schedule

References

BYU
BYU Cougars football seasons
BYU Cougars football